Marianus Königsperger (also called Johann Erhard Königsberger) born 2 December 1708 in Roding (Oberpfalz); and died 9 October 1769 in the Prüfening Abbey at Regensburg) was a German composer, organist and Catholic Monk of the Benedictine Order.

Works 

 Vocal music 
 33 Cantilenae sacrae for voices, 2 Violins and Organ op. 1, Lotter, Augsburg 1733
 10 Missae solemnes and 2 Missae pastoritiae such as 1 Veni Sancte Spiritus op. 1, Lang, Regensburg 1740
 8 Offertories op. 2, Lang, Regensburg 1741
 6 Miserere and 2 Stabat mater op. 3, Klaffschenkel, Augsburg 1743
 6 Missae op. 4, Lotter, Augsburg 1743
 4 Vespern and 4 marianische Antiphonen op. 5, Klaffschenkel, Augsburg 1743
 6 Missae rurales and 2 Requiem for 2 Voices and Basso continuo, other Strings and Instruments ad libitum op. 6, Klaffschenkel, Augsburg 1744
 6 solenne Litaneien op. 7, Klaffschenkel, Augsburg 1744
 17 Offertorien op. 8, Lotter, Augsburg 1744
 6 Missae solemniores and 1 Te Deum op. 10, Klaffschenkel, Augsburg 1747
 6 Stabat Mater op. 11, Lotter, Augsburg 1748
 4 Stationen zum Fest Corporis Christi, 8 Hymnen, 1 Offertorium, 1 Aria de passione and 1 Te Deum op. 12, Lotter, Augsburg 1748
 17 Vesperpsalmen, 1 Magnificat and 4 marianische Antiphonen for 2 Voices and Basso continuo, other voices and Instruments ad libitum op. 13, Lotter, Augsburg 1749 (2. Auflage 1755)
 3 Vesperpsalmen and 4 marianische Antiphonen op. 14, Lotter, Augsburg 1750
 6 Missae solemniores and 1 Veni Sancte Spiritus op. 15, Lotter, Augsburg 1750
 6 solenne Litaneien op. 17, Lotter, Augsburg 1753
 6 rurale Litaneien and 4 Arien for 2 Voices and Basso continuo, other Voices and Instruments ad libitum op. 19, Lotter, Augsburg 1755
 2 Requiem and 2 Libera op. 20, Lotter, Augsburg 1756
 6 Missae solemnes op. 21, Schmid, Regensburg 1760
 10 Kantaten op. 22, Lotter, Augsburg 1763
 5 Missae solemnes and 1 Requiem op. 23, Lotter, Augsburg 1764
 2 Vespern and 4 marianische Antiphonen op. 24, Lotter, Augsburg 1767
 2 Missae, 2 Offertorien and 1 Te Deum op. 25, Lotter, Augsburg 1767
 1 Offertorium without opus number, Lotter, Augsburg 1756
 1 Offertorium duplicis textus (»Pater noster / Benedictus sancta trinitas«) without opus number, Lotter, Augsburg 1757
 1 Missa pastoritia for 4 Voices, 2 Violins, 2 Trumpets and Violoncello without opus number, Lotter, Augsburg 1769
 Vespern and 4 Antiphonen in C, F, G and C, without opus number and without year.
 3 Vespern and 4 Antiphonen in C, G, F and C, without opus number and without year.
 1 Alma redemptoris mater D-Dur
 1 Ave Regina for Bass Voice, 2 Violins, 2 Horns and double Bass continuo
 1 Credidi C-Dur
 1 Cum invocarem
 1 Litaniae C-Dur
 1 Lythania C-Dur
 Lythaniae solennes C-Dur
 Litaniae C-Dur
 1 Messe F-Dur for Sopran, Alt ad libitum, Bass Voice and Organ
 1 Messe g-Moll for Soprano, Alt, Bass ad libitum and Organ
 1 Missa pastoritia D-Dur
 1 Salve Regina D-Dur
 Works for the theater
 Bellisarius, die von dem Neyd verfinsterte Welt-Ehr, Amberg 1736
 Libertas in Captivitate, Amberg 1736
 Inconstantia Humani Favoris, Amberg 1736
 Lumen Fidei, Amberg 1736
 Gering-Schätzung der Marianischen Versamblung, mit unglückseligem Tod bestrafet, Amberg 1736
 Virtus in pueris adulta, Amberg Mai 1736
 Maria, eine sichere Zuflucht-Statt der Sünder, Amberg 1737
 Sanctus Laurentius Justinianus, Amberg 1737
 Mater Sanctae Spei, Amberg 1737
 Fabula Saturnalitia, Amberg 1737
 Codrus Atheniensium Rex amoris victima, Amberg 1737
 Mira Amoris Metamorphosis, Amberg 1737
 Rodericus De Spina ex Rosa, Amberg 1737
 Alphonsus suimet victor. Das ist Glorreicher Sieg Alphonsi über sich selbst, Dillingen 4. September 1737
 Gloriosa filii in Parentem pietas, Amberg 1738
 Filialis amor Deiparae, Ingolstadt 18. Mai 1738
 Mater gratiae, Ingolstadt 11. Januar 1739
 S. Rainerius noxii pudoris victor, Ingolstadt 10. Mai 1739
 Dem Leben eines bösen Sodalis gemäßer Tod, 1739
 Mater gratiae, München 10. November 1743
 Alphonsus Magnus Se ipso major, undated
 S. Rainerius sacrilegi pudoris victor, München 1745
 Abraham sich zweymal schlachtend, undated
 Priflinga in anniversaria solennitate, 1761
 Salomon rex sapientia a Deo collata, 1763
 Instrumental Music
 12 Sonates concertantes for solo Violin, 2 Violins, Viola and Double Bass continuo op. 9, Klaffschenkel, Augsburg 1745
 10 Symphoniae for Strings and obligatto Organ, 2 Trompets and Drums ad libitum op. 16, 1751
 6 Konzerte and 2 Pastorellen for Organ und obligatto Strings, 2 Trumpets or Horns ad libitum op. 18, 1754
 Praeambulum cum fuga primi, secundi, tertii, quarti toni for Organ, 1755
 Praeambulum cum fuga sexti, septimi, octavi toni for Organ, 1756
 Praeambulum cum fuga primi (-octavi) toni, 1756
 Finger-Streit oder Clavier-Übung durch ein Praeambulum und Fugen, so mit scharfen, harten und weichen Tonen vermengt, 1760
 Der wohl-unterwiesene Clavier-Schüler, 1755, 2. Auflage 1761, 3. Auflage 1772.

Literature 
 M. A. Radice: The Nature of the Style Galant: Evidence from the Repertoire, in: Musical Quarterly Nr. 83, 1999, Edition 4, pages 607–647

References

External links 
 

1708 births
1769 deaths
18th-century German composers
18th-century German male musicians
German organists
German Benedictines